Sok Rithy (born December 30, 1990 in Cambodia) is a former Cambodian footballer.

International goals

References

External links
 

1990 births
Living people
Cambodian footballers
Cambodia international footballers
Preah Khan Reach Svay Rieng FC players
Association football defenders
Nagaworld FC players